Kilmogue Portal Tomb, also called Leac an Scail, is a dolmen (portal tomb) and National Monument located in County Kilkenny, Ireland.

Location

History

Most dolmens were built c. 3000 BC, i.e. in the Neolithic. They may not have been graves; their exact purpose is unknown.

The name "Kilmogue" derives its name from the Irish Cill Mhóg, "Mog's church", referring to the Celtic deity Mogons, a god associated with mountains and whose name is cognate with "might." However, dolmens were built long before Celtic culture reached Ireland (800–400 BC); this could indicate that the Celtic settlers adopted the ancient monument for their own god.

Another name is Leac an Scail, "the hero's stone." Scal literally means "burst", and scal ghréine (sunburst) is used to refer to the mythological warriors the Fianna. This could also be Leac an Scáil, "the phantom's stone".

Description

The dolmen is constructed of granite with quartz veins, using a large capstone resting on two large portal stones and a pillow stone resting on a backstone. The entrance faces northeast, i.e. towards the summer solstice sunrise, and has a door-stone.

References

National Monuments in County Kilkenny
Archaeological sites in County Kilkenny
Dolmens in Ireland
Tombs in the Republic of Ireland